Bmibaby served the following destinations before its closure on 9 September 2012:

Europe

Channel Islands
Jersey – Jersey Airport
Croatia
Dubrovnik – Dubrovnik Airport
Czech Republic
Prague – Prague Ruzyně Airport
France
Nice – Nice Côte d'Azur Airport
Perpignan – Perpignan Rivesaltes Airport
Gibraltar
Gibraltar Airport [seasonal]
Italy
Alghero – Fertilia Airport [seasonal]
Naples – Naples International Airport [seasonal]
Rome – Leonardo da Vinci-Fiumicino Airport 
Venice – Venice Marco Polo Airport 
Verona – Verona Airport [seasonal]
Malta
Malta International Airport [seasonal]
Portugal
Faro – Faro Airport 
Lisbon – Lisbon Portela Airport [seasonal]
Spain
Alicante – Alicante Airport 
Almeria – Almería Airport [seasonal]
Barcelona – Barcelona Airport 
Ibiza – Ibiza Airport [seasonal]
Málaga – Málaga Airport 
Menorca – Mahon Airport 
Murcia – Murcia-San Javier Airport 
Palma de Mallorca – Palma de Mallorca Airport
United Kingdom
Birmingham – Birmingham Airport Base
Nottingham/Leicester/Derby – East Midlands Airport Base

Terminated destinations
Bmibaby also served these destinations but they were already terminated before the closure of the airline:
Austria – Salzburg
Denmark – Copenhagen
France – Basel, Bordeaux, Chambéry, Lourdes, Montpellier, Paris, Perpignan, Toulouse
Germany – Cologne/Bonn, Munich
Greece – Corfu
Ireland – Cork, Dublin, Knock
Netherlands – Amsterdam
Switzerland – Geneva
United Kingdom – Aberdeen, Belfast-City, Belfast-International, Bournemouth, Bristol, Cardiff, Durham, Edinburgh, Glasgow, London Gatwick, London Stansted, Manchester, Newquay

External links
 bmibaby.com

See also
BMI Regional
British Midland International

References

Lists of airline destinations